Panmure District School is a primary school in the suburb of Panmure, New Zealand.

The school is located on Mt. Wellington Highway, in the view of Maungarei / Mount Wellington.

It is the oldest school in the Panmure area.

Notes

Primary schools in Auckland